Herreid may refer to:
Herreid, South Dakota, a city in Campbell County, South Dakota, United States
Herreid (surname)